The French intervention in Mexico (1862–1867) was an invasion of the Republic of Mexico by the army of the Second French Empire in 1862. It resulted in the establishment of the Second Mexican Empire in 1864, which was supported by many conservative Mexicans, under the Austrian Maximilian I of Mexico. Although the empire established control of the center of the country, the republicans held out in the North and South. With the end of the American Civil War, the United States lent its support to the republicans and put pressure on the French to withdraw in 1866. The imperial forces fought on, but were defeated in a series of battles, with the republicans regaining control of the City of Mexico on 15 May 1867.
Maximilian was captured and then executed on 19 June 1867. History records show that there were all in all 1,020 minor or major battles and sieges in the intervention.

Battles and sieges

References

External links
 Alphabetical and chronological catalog of armed conflicts in Mexico from independence to 1894

Battles of the Second French intervention in Mexico